The 2016 AFC Cup qualifying round was played from 11 to 15 August 2015. A total of six teams competed in the qualifying round to decide two places in the competition proper of the 2016 AFC Cup.

The AFC Cup qualifying round was held to replace the AFC President's Cup, whose last edition was held in 2014, as starting from 2015, league champions of "emerging countries" were eligible to participate in the AFC Cup qualifying play-off.

Teams
A total of six teams six nine AFC associations competed in the qualifying round. Teams were not split into zones for the qualifying round.

In the following table, the number of appearances and last appearance count all those since the 2004 season (including both competition proper and qualifying rounds).

Draw

The draw for the qualifying round was held on 29 June 2015 at the AFC House in Kuala Lumpur, Malaysia. The six teams were drawn into two groups of three.

For the draw, the pre-selected hosts were placed in their own pot, while the remaining teams were seeded according to the performance of their association in the 2014 AFC President's Cup.

Format

In the qualifying round, each group was played on a single round-robin basis at the pre-selected hosts. The winners of each group advanced to either the qualifying play-off or the group stage (depending on number of teams in each zone and geographical location).

Tiebreakers
The teams were ranked according to points (3 points for a win, 1 point for a draw, 0 points for a loss). If tied on points, tiebreakers would be applied in the following order:
Greater number of points obtained in the group matches between the teams concerned;
Goal difference resulting from the group matches between the teams concerned;
Greater number of goals scored in the group matches between the teams concerned;
Goal difference in all the group matches;
Greater number of goals scored in all the group matches;
Penalty shoot-out if only two teams are involved and they are both on the field of play;
Fewer score calculated according to the number of yellow and red cards received in the group matches (1 point for a single yellow card, 3 points for a red card as a consequence of two yellow cards, 3 points for a direct red card, 4 points for a yellow card followed by a direct red card);
Drawing of lots.

Schedule
The schedule of each matchday was as follows.

Host Countries

Groups

Group A
All matches were held in Bhutan.
Times listed were UTC+6.

Group B
All matches were held in Kyrgyzstan.
Times listed were UTC+6.

References

External links
AFC Cup, the-AFC.com

0
AFC Cup qualifying round